The Spanish and Portuguese Synagogue of Montreal, also known as Shearith Israel, is a Montreal synagogue, located on St. Kevin Street in Snowdon, which is the oldest Jewish congregation in Canada. The Congregation traces its history back to 1760 and was formally established in 1768. It is affiliated with the Orthodox Union.

Architecture

By 1777 the Jewish community in Montreal felt itself able to erect and support a synagogue. Lazarus David had died in 1776 but on August 14, 1777 his widow, Phoebe, sold for 1200 French livres part of David's property to three of the congregation's leading members, Samuel Judah, Simon Levy and Andrew Hays, recently married to her daughter Abigail (Branny). The building, completed the following year, stood behind a low stone wall, had a high red roof, and was located at the junction of Little St. James and Notre Dame Streets, a site now partially occupied by the Palais de justice.
  
The congregation's second building, also the second synagogue built in Quebec, was constructed on Chenneville Street in 1838. The Judeo-Egyptian style temple-like building had a front of cut stone, adorned with a portico with two columns. This was the only formal place for Jewish worship in Montreal until 1846. Charles T. Ballard, architect, designed a new and larger synagogue for the Spanish and Portuguese Congregation on Stanley Street in the Egyptian Revival style of architecture in 1887–1890.

The congregation has been housed in its fourth premises in Snowdon, part of Côte-des-Neiges–Notre-Dame-de-Grâce borough, since 1947.

In the sanctuary, Torah is read to the congregation from the bimah and the Torah scrolls are stored in the aron kodesh on the east wall. The congregation faces towards the east, and Jerusalem, in praying. The ornamentation features symbols such as Stars of David, signs of the zodiac and natural forms.

Rabbinic leadership

Notable rabbis of the synagogue include Jacob Raphael Cohen (rabbi 1784–1811), Abraham de Sola (1847–1882) and his son Meldola de Sola (?–1919), and Rabbi Dr. Solomon Frank (1947–1982). Immediate past rabbis are Shachar Orenstein and Howard Joseph, who served the community from 1970 until his death.

See also

 Spanish and Portuguese Jews
 Oldest synagogues in the world
 Oldest synagogues in Canada

References

External links
 
 Abraham de Sola-Evelyn Miller Fonds McGill University Library & Archives.

18th-century synagogues
Orthodox Judaism in Quebec
Orthodox synagogues in Canada
Portuguese-Canadian culture
Portuguese-Jewish diaspora
Religious organizations established in 1768
Montreal
Spanish-Canadian culture
Synagogues in Montreal
Sephardi Jewish culture in Canada
Sephardi synagogues
Spanish-Jewish diaspora
1768 establishments in the British Empire